Headhunting is the practice of hunting a human and collecting the severed head after killing the victim, although sometimes more portable body parts (such as ear, nose or scalp) are taken instead as trophies.  Headhunting was practiced in historic times in parts of Europe, East Asia, Oceania, Southeast Asia, South Asia, Mesoamerica, West and Central Africa.

The headhunting practice has been the subject of intense study within the anthropological community, where scholars try to assess and interpret its social roles, functions, and motivations. Anthropological writings explore themes in headhunting that include mortification of the rival, ritual violence, cosmological balance, the display of manhood, cannibalism, dominance over the body and soul of his enemies in life and afterlife, as a trophy and proof of killing (achievement in hunting), show of greatness, prestige by taking on a rival's spirit and power, and as a means of securing the services of the victim as a slave in the afterlife.

Today's scholars generally agree that headhunting's primary function was ritual and ceremonial. It was part of the process of structuring, reinforcing, and defending hierarchical relationships between communities and individuals. Some experts theorize that the practice stemmed from the belief that the head contained "soul matter" or life force, which could be harnessed through its capture.

Asia and Oceania

Melanesia 

Headhunting was practiced by many Austronesian people in Southeast Asia and the Pacific Islands. Headhunting has at one time or another been practiced among most of the peoples of Melanesia, including New Guinea. A missionary found 10,000 skulls in a community longhouse on Goaribari Island in 1901.

Historically, the Marind-anim in New Guinea were famed because of their headhunting. The practice was rooted in their belief system and linked to the name-giving of the newborn. The skull was believed to contain a mana-like force. Headhunting was not motivated primarily by cannibalism, but the dead person's flesh was consumed in ceremonies following the capture and killing.

The Korowai, a Papuan tribe in the southeast of Irian Jaya, live in tree houses, some nearly 40 metres (100') high. This was originally believed to be a defensive practice, presumably as protection against the Citak, a tribe of neighbouring headhunters. Some researchers believe that the American Michael Rockefeller, who disappeared in New Guinea in 1961 while on a field trip, may have been taken by headhunters in the Asmat region. He was the son of New York Governor Nelson Rockefeller.

In The Cruise of the Snark (1911), the account by Jack London of his 1905 adventure sailing in Micronesia, he recounted that headhunters of Malaita attacked his ship during a stay in Langa Langa Lagoon, particularly around Laulasi Island. His and other ships were kidnapping villagers as workers on plantations, a practice known as blackbirding. Captain Mackenzie of the ship Minolta was beheaded by villagers as retribution for the loss of village men during an armed labour "recruiting" drive. The villagers  believed that the ship's crew "owed" several more heads before the score was even.

Southeast Asia 

In Southeast Asia, anthropological writings have explored headhunting and other practices of the Murut, Dusun Lotud, Ilongot, Igorot, Iban, Dayak, Berawan, Wana, and Mappurondo tribes. Among these groups, headhunting was usually a ritual activity rather than an act of war or feuding. A warrior would take a single head. Headhunting acted as a catalyst for the cessation of personal and collective mourning for the community's dead. Ideas of manhood and marriage were encompassed in the practice, and the taken heads were highly prized. Other reasons for headhunting included capture of enemies as slaves, looting of valuable properties, intra and inter-ethnic conflicts, and territorial expansion.

Italian anthropologist and explorer Elio Modigliani visited the headhunting communities in South Nias (an island to the west of Sumatra) in 1886; he wrote a detailed study of their society and beliefs. He found that the main purpose of headhunting was the belief that, if a man owned another person's skull, his victim would serve as a slave of the owner for eternity in the afterlife. Human skulls were a valuable commodity. Sporadic headhunting continued in Nias island until the late 20th century, the last reported incident dating from 1998.

Headhunting was practiced among Sumba people until the early 20th century. It was done only in large war parties. When the men hunted wild animals, by contrast, they operated in silence and secrecy. The skulls collected were hung on the skull tree erected in the center of village.

Kenneth George wrote about annual headhunting rituals that he observed among the Mappurondo religious minority, an upland tribe in the southwest part of the Indonesian island of Sulawesi. Heads are not taken; instead, surrogate heads in the form of coconuts are used in a ritual ceremony. The ritual, called pangngae, takes place at the conclusion of the rice-harvesting season. It functions to bring an end to communal mourning for the deceased of the past year; express intercultural tensions and polemics; allow for a display of manhood; distribute communal resources; and resist outside pressures to abandon Mappurondo ways of life.

United States authorities in the Philippines suppressed headhunting among the Ilongot in the 1930s. The Igorot in the Philippines also practiced headhunting.

The Wa people, whose domain straddles the Burma-China border, were once known to Europeans as the "Wild Wa" for their "savage" behavior. Until the 1970s, the Wa practiced headhunting.

In Sarawak, the north-western region of the island of Borneo, "White Rajah" James Brooke and his descendants established a dynasty. They eradicated headhunting in the hundred years before World War II. Before Brooke's arrival, the Iban had migrated from the middle Kapuas region into the upper Batang Lupar river region by fighting and displacing the small existing tribes, such as the Seru and Bukitan. Another successful migration by the Iban was from the Saribas region into the Kanowit area in the middle of the Batang Rajang river, led by the famous Mujah "Buah Raya". They fought and displaced such tribes as the Kanowit and Baketan.

Brooke first encountered the headhunting Iban of the Saribas-Skrang in Sarawak at the Battle of Betting Maru in 1849. He gained the signing of the Saribas Treaty with the Iban chief of that region, who was named Orang Kaya Pemancha Dana "Bayang". Subsequently, the Brooke dynasty expanded their territory from the first small Sarawak region to the present-day state of Sarawak. They enlisted the Malay, Iban, and other natives as a large unpaid force to defeat and pacify any rebellions in the states. The Brooke administration prohibited headhunting  (ngayau in Iban language) and issued penalties for disobeying the Rajah-led government decree. During expeditions sanctioned by the Brooke administration, they allowed headhunting. The natives who participated in Brooke-approved punitive expeditions were exempted from paying annual tax to the Brooke administration and/or given new territories in return for their service. There were intra-tribal and intertribal headhunting.

The most famous Iban warrior to resist the authority of the Brooke administration was Libau "Rentap". The Brooke government had to send three successive punitive expeditions in order to defeat Rentapi at his fortress on the top of Sadok Hill. Brooke's force suffered major defeats during the first two expeditions. During the third and final expedition, Brooke built a large cannon called Bujang Sadok (Prince of Sadok Mount) to rival Rentap's cannon nicknamed Bujang Timpang Berang (The One Arm Bachelor) and made a truce with the sons of a famous chief, who supported Rentap in not recognizing the government of Brooke due to his policies.

The Iban performed a third major migration from upper Batang Ai region in the Batang Lupar region into the Batang Kanyau (Embaloh) onwards the upper Katibas and then to the Baleh/Mujong regions in the upper Batang Rajang region. They displaced the existing tribes of the Kayan, Kajang, Ukit, etc. The Brooke administration sanctioned the last migrations of the Iban, and reduced any conflict to a minimum. The Iban conducted sacred ritual ceremonies with special and complex incantations to invoke god's blessings, which were associated with headhunting. An example was the Bird Festival in the Saribas/Skrang region and Proper Festival in the Baleh region, both required for men of the tribes to become effective warriors.

During the Japanese occupation during the Second World War, headhunting was revived among the natives. The Sukarno-led Indonesian forces fought against the formation of the Federation of Malaysia. Forces of Malaya, Singapore, Sabah and Sarawak fought in addition, and headhunting was observed during the communist insurgency in Sarawak and what was then Malaya. The Iban were noted for headhunting, and were later recognised as good rangers and trackers during military operations, during which they were awarded fourteen medals of valour and honour.

Since 1997 serious inter-ethnic violence has erupted on the island of Kalimantan, involving the indigenous Dayak peoples and immigrants from the island of Madura. Events have included the Sambas riots and Sampit conflict. In 2001, during the Sampit conflict in the Central Kalimantan town of Sampit, at least 500 Madurese were killed and up to 100,000 Madurese were forced to flee. Some Madurese bodies were decapitated in a ritual reminiscent of the Dayak headhunting tradition.

The Moluccans, an ethnic group of mixed Austronesian-Papuan origin living in the Moluccas, were fierce headhunters until the Dutch colonial rule in Indonesia suppressed the practice.

New Zealand

In what is now known as New Zealand, the Māori preserved the heads of some of their ancestors as well as certain enemies in a form known as mokomokai. They removed the brain and eyes, and smoked the head, preserving the moko tattoos. The heads were sold to European collectors in the late 1800s, in some instances having been commissioned and "made to order".  Currently the Māori are attempting to reclaim the heads of their own ancestors held in museums outside New Zealand. Twenty heads were returned to them by French authorities in January 2012, repatriated from museums.

China
During the Spring and Autumn period and Warring States period, Qin soldiers frequently collected their  defeated enemies' heads as a means to accumulate merits.  After Shang Yang's reforms, the Qin armies adopted a meritocracy system that awards the average soldiers, most of whom were conscripted serfs and were not paid, an opportunity to earn promotions and rewards from their superiors by collecting the heads of enemies, a type of body count.  In this area, authorities also displayed heads of executed criminals in public spaces up to the early 20th century.

The Wa people, a mountain ethnic minority in Southwest China, eastern Myanmar (Shan State) and northern Thailand, were once known as the "Wild Wa" by British colonists due to their traditional practice of headhunting.

Japan
 
Tom O'Neill wrote: 
Samurai also sought glory by headhunting. When a battle ended, the warrior, true to his mercenary origins, would ceremoniously present trophy heads to a general, who would variously reward him with promotions in rank, gold or silver, or land from the defeated clan. Generals displayed the heads of defeated rivals in public squares.

Taiwan

Headhunting was a common practice among Taiwanese aborigines. All tribes practiced headhunting except the Yami people, who were previously isolated on Orchid Island, and the Ivatan people. It was associated with the peoples of the Philippines.

Taiwanese Plains Aborigines, Han Taiwanese and Japanese settlers were choice victims of headhunting raids by Taiwanese Mountain Aborigines. The latter two groups were considered invaders, liars, and enemies. A headhunting raid would often strike at workers in the fields, or set a dwelling on fire and then kill and behead those who fled from the burning structure. The practice continued during the Japanese occupation of Taiwan, but ended in the 1930s due to brutal suppression by the Japanese colonial government.

The Taiwanese Aboriginal tribes, who were allied with the Dutch against the Chinese during the Guo Huaiyi Rebellion in 1652, turned against the Dutch in turn during the Siege of Fort Zeelandia. They defected to Koxinga's Chinese forces. The Aboriginals (Formosans) of Sincan defected to Koxinga after he offered them amnesty. The Sincan Aboriginals fought for the Chinese and beheaded Dutch people in executions. The frontier aboriginals in the mountains and plains also surrendered and defected to the Chinese on May 17, 1661, celebrating their freedom from compulsory education under Dutch rule. They hunted down Dutch people, beheading them and trashing their Christian school textbooks.

At the Battle of Tamsui in the Keelung Campaign during the Sino-French War on 8 October 1884, the Chinese took prisoners and beheaded 11 French marines who were injured, in addition to La Galissonnière's captain Fontaine. The heads were mounted on bamboo poles and displayed to incite anti-French feelings. In China, pictures of the beheading of the Frenchmen were published in the Tien-shih-tsai Pictorial Journal in Shanghai.

Han and Taiwanese Aboriginals revolted against the Japanese in the Beipu Uprising in 1907 and Tapani Incident in 1915. The Seediq aboriginals revolted against the Japanese in the 1930 Wushe Incident and resurrected the practice of headhunting, beheading Japanese during the revolt.

Indian subcontinent and Myanmar

Headhunting has been a practice among the Khasis, Kukis, the Wild Wa, Mizo, the Garo and the Naga ethnic groups of India, Bangladesh and Myanmar till the 19th century. Kafirs in eastern Afghanistan were headhunters until the late 19th century.

Americas

Amazon

Several tribes of the Jivaroan group, including the Shuar in Eastern Ecuador and Northern Peru, along the rivers Chinchipe, Bobonaza, Morona, Upano, and Pastaza, main tributaries of the Amazon, practiced headhunting for trophies. The heads were shrunk, and were known locally as Tzan-Tzas. The people believed that the head housed the soul of the person killed.

In the 21st century, the Shuar produce Tzan-tza replicas. They use their traditional process on heads of monkeys and sloths, selling the items to tourists. It is believed that splinter groups in the local tribes continue with these practices when there is a tribal feud over territory or as revenge for a crime of passion. 

The Quechua Lamista in Peru used to be headhunters.

Mesoamerican civilizations

A tzompantli is a type of wooden rack or palisade documented in several Mesoamerican civilizations. It was used for the public display of human skulls, typically those of war captives or other sacrificial victims.

A tzompantli-type structure has been excavated at the La Coyotera, Oaxaca, site. It is dated to the Proto-Classic Zapotec civilization, which flourished from c. 2nd century BCE to the 3rd century CE. Tzompantli are also noted in other Mesoamerican pre-Columbian cultures, such as the Toltec and Mixtec.

Based on numbers given by the conquistador Andrés de Tapia and Fray Diego Durán, Bernard Ortiz de Montellano has calculated in the late 20th century that there were at most 60,000 skulls on the Hueyi Tzompantli (great Skullrack) of Tenochtitlan. There were at least five more skullracks in Tenochtitlan, but, by all accounts, they were much smaller.

Other examples are indicated from Maya civilization sites. A particularly fine and intact inscription example survives at the extensive Chichen Itza site.

Nazca culture
The Nazca used decapitated heads, known as trophy heads, in various religious rituals.  Late Nazca iconography suggests that the prestige of the leaders of Late Nazca society was enhanced by successful headhunting.

Europe

Celts

The Celts of Europe practiced headhunting as the head was believed to house a person's soul. Ancient Romans and Greeks recorded the Celts' habits of nailing heads of personal enemies to walls or dangling them from the necks of horses.  Headhunting was still practiced for a great deal longer by the Celtic Gaels. In the Ulster Cycle, Cúchulainn is described as beheading the three sons of Nechtan and mounting their heads on his chariot. This is believed to have been a traditional warrior, rather than religious, practice. The practice continued approximately to the end of the Middle Ages in Ireland and the Anglo-Scottish marches. The religious reasons for collecting heads were likely lost after the Celts' conversion to Christianity.
In former Celtic areas, cephalophore representations of saints (miraculously carrying their decapitated heads) were common.
Heads were also taken among the Germanic tribes and among Iberians, but the purpose is unknown.

Scythians
The Scythians were excellent horsemen. Ancient Greek historian Herodotus wrote that some of their tribes practiced human sacrifice, drinking the blood of victims, scalping their enemies, and drinking wine from the enemies' skulls.

Montenegrins
The Montenegrins are an ethnic group in Southeastern Europe who are centered around the Dinaric mountains. They practiced headhunting until 1876, allegedly carrying the head from a lock of hair grown specifically for that purpose.
In the 1830s, Montenegrin ruler Petar II Petrović-Njegoš started building a tower called "Tablja" above Cetinje Monastery. The tower was never finished, and Montenegrins used it to display Turkish heads taken in battle, as they were in frequent conflict with the Ottoman Empire. In 1876 King Nicholas I of Montenegro ordered that the practice should end. He knew that European diplomats considered it to be barbaric. The Tablja was demolished in 1937.

Modern times

Second Sino-Japanese War

Nanjing massacre

Many Chinese soldiers and civilians were beheaded by some Japanese soldiers, who even made contests to see who would kill more people (see contest to kill 100 people using a sword), and took photos with the piles of heads as souvenirs.

World War II
During World War II, Allied (specifically including American) troops occasionally collected the skulls of dead Japanese as personal trophies, as souvenirs for friends and family at home, and for sale to others. (The practice was unique to the Pacific theater; United States forces did not take skulls of German and Italian soldiers.)  In September 1942, the Commander in Chief of the Pacific Fleet mandated strong disciplinary action against any soldier who took enemy body parts as souvenirs. But such trophy-hunting persisted: Life published a photograph in its issue of May 22, 1944, of a young woman posing with the autographed skull sent to her by her Navy boyfriend. There was public outrage in the US in response.

Historians have suggested that the practice related to Americans viewing the Japanese as lesser people, and in response to mutilation and torture of American war dead. In Borneo, retaliation by natives against the Japanese was based on atrocities having been committed by the Imperial Japanese Army in that area. Following their ill treatment by the Japanese, the Dayak of Borneo formed a force to help the Allies. Australian and British special operatives of Z Special Unit developed some of the inland Dayak tribesmen into a thousand-strong headhunting army. This army of tribesmen killed or captured some 1,500 Japanese soldiers.

Malayan Emergency 
During the Malayan Emergency, British and Commonwealth forces hired Iban (Dayak) headhunters from Borneo to decapitate suspected pro-independence guerrillas, claiming this was done for "identification" purposes. Iban headhunters were permitted to claim the scalps of corpses as trophies. Privately, the Colonial Office noted that "there is no doubt that under international law a similar case in wartime would be a war crime". Skull fragments from a trophy skull was later found to have been displayed in a British regimental museum. 

In 1952, April, the British communist newspaper the Daily Worker (today known as the Morning Star) published a photograph of British Royal Marines in a British military base in Malaya openly posing with decapitated human heads. Initially British government spokespersons belonging to the Admiralty and the Colonial Office claimed the photograph was fake. In response to the accusations that their headhunting photograph was fake, the Daily Worker released yet another photograph taken in Malaya showing British soldiers posing with a decapitated head. In response the Colonial Secretary Oliver Lyttelton  confirmed to parliament that the Daily Worker headhunting photos were indeed genuine. In response to the Daily Worker articles exposing the decapitation of MNLA suspects, the practice was banned by Winston Churchill who feared that such photographs would give ammunition to communist propaganda.

Despite the shocking imagery of the photographs of soldiers posing with decapitated heads in Malaya, the Daily Worker was the only British newspaper to publish them during the 20th century, and the photographs were virtually ignored by the mainstream British press.

Malayan Emergency headhunting gallery

Vietnam War 
During the Vietnam War, some American soldiers engaged in the practice of taking "trophy skulls".

General gallery

See also 
 Shrunken head
 Decapitation
 Tribal warfare
 Human sacrifice
 Trophy
 Laulasi Island
 Beheading in Islam
 Headless Horseman
 Plastered human skulls

References

Citations

Sources 
 Davidson, James Wheeler, The island of Formosa, past and present: History, people, resources, and commercial prospects. Tea, camphor, sugar, gold, coal, sulphur, economical plants, and other productions (London, 1903)
 Davidson, James Wheeler, The Island of Formosa: Historical View from 1430 to 1900 (London, 1903)
 
 
 
  The title means Sons of the killing father. Stories about demons and headhunting, recorded in New Guinea.
 
 
 James J. Weingartner (1992) "Trophies of War: U.S. Troops and the Mutilation of Japanese War Dead, 1941 – 1945" Pacific Historical Review

Further reading 
 Head-Hunting Roman Cavalry - article about single combat and the taking of heads and scalps as trophies by Roman warriors
 Les Romains, chasseurs de têtes - paper by Jean-Louis Voisin about the Roman practice of head hunting

External links

Encyclopædia Britannica entry, 1996
Headhunting and headshrinking among the Shuar

 
Anthropology
Human trophy collecting